Masako Sakamoto (born 10 October 1972) is a Japanese badminton player. She competed in women's doubles at the 1996 Summer Olympics in Atlanta.

References

External links

1972 births
Living people
Japanese female badminton players
Olympic badminton players of Japan
Badminton players at the 1996 Summer Olympics